Yuexiu District is one of 11 urban districts of the prefecture-level city of Guangzhou, the capital of Guangdong Province, China, located west of the Tianhe District and east of the Liwan District. It is the commercial, political and cultural centre of Guangdong and noted for its high-quality education. The Guangdong provincial government and the Guangzhou city government are both located in the Yuexiu District. Established in 1960, the district absorbed the former Dongshan District in May 2005 along with several former subdistricts of the Baiyun and Tianhe district. Yuexiu District has 18 streets under its jurisdiction. The total area is 33.8 square kilometers. According to the seventh census data, as of 0:00 on November 1, 2020, the resident population of Yuexiu District was 1,038,643.

History
Yuexiu is the historic center of the capital of the Nanyue Kingdom. Little was known of yuexiu district before Qin dynasty ( 秦代 ）.However, according to archaeological discoveries, we are now confirmed there were inhabitants settled in Guangzhou region at least three thousand to four thousand years ago. Thirty-three years after the unification of Lingnan under Qin Shi Huang forced most of the Yue tribes out of Guangzhou and assimilated the rest remaining, Yuexiu came under the administration of Panyu County in the Nanhai Commandery. Yuexiu District is named after Yuexiu Hill. Yuexiu was originally the seat of Panyu County until 15 February 1921 when Guangzhou was formally established carving parts of northern Panyu County to create Yuexiu along with Liwan which was eastern part of Nanhai County.

Dongshan in the eastern part of Yuexiu was a former suburb of Guangzhou. It was established as "Dongshan District" in 1960. On 28 April 2005, it was withdrawn and merged with Yuexiu.

Geography 
Yuexiu District starts from Guangzhou Avenue in the east and borders Tianhe District; it faces the Pearl River in the south and faces Haizhu District across the river; it extends to Renmin Road in the west and is adjacent to Liwan District; it reaches the foot of Baiyun Mountain in the north and is adjacent to Baiyun District and Tianhe District. It is the old central city of Guangzhou. The total area of Yuexiu District is 33.8 square kilometers.

Administrative subdivisions
Yuexiu has administrative jurisdiction over the following 18 subdistricts

 On 15 March 2013 Dongfeng Subdistrict merged into Liurong Subdistrict, Shishu Subdistrict merged into Guangta Subdistrict, Daxin Subdistrict merged into Renmin Subdistrict, and Guangwei Subdistrict merged into Beijing Subdistrict.

Government
The Guangdong Department of Education is headquartered in Yuexiu District.

Economy
Creative Power Entertaining is headquartered in the Wuzi Building  in the Yuexiu District.

The Mainland China offices of Dairy Farm Group are located at the Guangdong Mechanical Sub-Building  in the district.

Transportation

Metro
Yuexiu is currently served by four metro lines operated by the Guangzhou Metro:
 - Yangji, Dongshankou, Martyrs' Park, Peasant Movement Institute, Gongyuanqian, Ximenkou
 - Guangzhou Station, Yuexiu Park, Sun Yat-sen Memorial Hall, Gongyuanqian, Haizhu Square
 - Guangzhou Station, Xiaobei, Taojin, Ouzhuang, Zoo, Yangji, Wuyangcun
  - Yide Lu, Haizhu Square, Beijing Lu, Tuanyida Square, Donghu, Dongshankou, Ouzhuang, Huanghuagang

Education

The American International School of Guangzhou elementary school campus is on Ersha Island in the district.

Previously the École Française Internationale de Canton, the French international school of Guangzhou, was located at the GoldArch Riverdale development on Ersha Island.

See also
Africans in Guangzhou

Notes

References

External links

Official website of Yuexiu District government 

 
Districts of Guangzhou